Santa is a farming community in the West Mamprusi District in the Northern Region of Ghana. People there are predominantly farmers.

References

Populated places in the Northern Region (Ghana)